Timur Sergeyevich Nikolayev (born 31 January 2001) is a Russian football player. He plays as a centre-back for FC Forte Taganrog on loan from FC Orenburg.

Club career
He made his debut for FC Orenburg on 31 August 2022 in a Russian Cup game against FC Akhmat Grozny.

Career statistics

References

External links
 
 
 
 

2001 births
Living people
Russian footballers
Association football defenders
FC Orenburg players
Russian Second League players